Ahmed El Geaidy (born 2 October 1996) is a Saudi Arabian-born Egyptian professional footballer who plays as a winger for Ghazl El Mahalla.

Club career
El Geaidy started his career at Ghazl Port Said before joining Ismaily on 23 May 2017. On 30 August 2017, El Geaidy was loaned out to Al-Merreikh. On 19 July 2018, El Geaidy joined Saudi Arabian side Al-Raed. On 27 January 2019, he was released from the club without making a single appearance. On 6 February 2019, El Geaidy joined Al-Washm. He left the club following their relegation to the Saudi Second Division. On 23 July 2019, El Geaidy joined Ohod. On 16 January 2020, he joined Jeddah and left the club following the conclusion of the 2019–20 season. On 7 February 2021, El Geaidy joined Al-Bukiryah. On 3 June 2021, El Geaidy joined Pro League club Al-Fateh on a one-year contract. He made his debut on 26 August 2021 in the league match against Al-Shabab. He left Al-Fateh following the expiration of his contract on 4 July 2022.

On 10 October 2022, El Geaidy joined Egyptian Premier League side Ghazl El Mahalla on a three-year contract.

References

External links
 
 

1995 births
Living people
Egyptian footballers
Association football wingers
Egyptian Second Division players
Saudi First Division League players
Saudi Professional League players
Egyptian Premier League players
Ismaily SC players
Al Merreikh SC (Egypt) players
Al-Raed FC players
Al-Washm Club players
Ohod Club players
Jeddah Club players
Al-Bukayriyah FC players
Al-Fateh SC players
Ghazl El Mahalla SC players